Venerable Thomas of Kurialacherry (14 January 1873 – 2 June 1925) was a Catholic bishop from Kerala. Kurialacherry was a member of the Syro-Malabar Catholic Church, and was the first bishop of what would become the Archdiocese of Changanassery.

Life
Kurialacherry was born on 14 January 1873 as the sixth child of Chackochen and Accamma in Champakulam, Kerala. He was baptized on the eighth day and was christened Thomas. After his primary education, Thomas joined St.Ephrem school in Mannanam.It was during this time that he felt a strong desire to become a priest.  

His seminary education was at the seminary of the Propaganda Fide in Rome. During the nine years he spent in Rome he excelled and became prefect of the seminarians. He was ordained on 27 March 1899 by Cardinal Cassantha at the Basilica of St. John in Lateran. After his ordination, he remained some time in Italy visiting various shrines. It was then that he was a guest for some days of Giuseppe Cardinal Sarto, Patriarch of Venice.  

While in Rome he was inspired by the piety of perpetual adoration sisters who spent day and night in adoration of the Blessed Sacrament; so he decided to spread eucharistic devotion in his homeland. As an ardent devotee of the Blessed Sacrament, he zealously promoted the 40 and 13 hour devotions. In 1908, he founded the Sisters of the Adoration of the Blessed Sacrament (SABS). Thomas Kurialacherry was appointed as the apostolic vicar of the Changanassery vicariate. He was consecrated on 3 December 1911 in Kandy, Ceylon. Bishop Kurialacherry was a social reformer and was enthusiastic about raising the marginalized sectors of society. He showed great care towards dalit Catholics. Mar Kurialacherry was an apostle of ecumenism; as a man with a wider perspective he worked for the unity of various Christian communities. He was confident that progress of the society could be achieved through education; this led him to establish many educational institutions including, in 1922, the prestigious St. Berchmans College in Changanassery.

In the silver jubilee year of his ordination bishop Thomas Kurialacherry went to Rome for his ad limina visit. He also had a desire to participate in the beatification of St. Therese of Lisieux. He had experienced episodes of rheumatism and was afflicted with uremia. While in Rome his illness worsened. He celebrated his last mass in the Propaganda College chapel on the 26th anniversary of his ordination. He died on 2 June 1925 in Rome. His mortal remains were brought back to his homeland in 1935 and interred in St. Mary's Metropolitan Cathedral, Changanassery and in 2014 they were transferred to the newly built Marthmariam kabaridappalli.

Bishop Kurialacherry was a strong advocate for the education of women: "When we educate a woman we are educating a generation." Bishop Kurialacherry College for Women in Amalagiri and Bishop Kurialacherry Public School in Champakulam are named after him.

Cause of canonization
In 1935, ten years after his death, his cause of canonization was initiated giving him the title "Servant of God". On 2 April 2011 Pope Benedict XVI, in an audience with Cardinal Angelo Amato, Prefect of the Congregation for the Causes of Saints, approved (along with the advancement of many other sainthood causes) a statement saying that Bishop Kurialachery had lived a life of heroic virtue. This gave him the additional title of "Venerable".

References

External links

 Archdiocese of Changanacherry

1873 births
1925 deaths
20th-century Eastern Catholic bishops
Archbishops of Changanassery
20th-century venerated Christians
People from Alappuzha district
Christian clergy from Kerala
Venerated Catholics by Pope Benedict XVI
Syro-Malabar bishops